"Ingenmansland" is a song written by Ingela 'Pling' Forsman and Bobby Ljunggren. It was released in 2001 on Lionheart International.

Jan Johansen performed the song at Melodifestivalen 2001, attaining the fourth spot. The single was released the same year. It charted at Svensktoppen for one week, and peaked at #6 on 17 March 2001.

Charts

References 

2001 singles
2001 songs
Jan Johansen (singer) songs
Melodifestivalen songs of 2001
Songs with lyrics by Ingela Forsman
Songs written by Bobby Ljunggren
Swedish-language songs